Colchicum micranthum is a species of flowering plant in the family Colchicaceae. It is native to Turkey with nearly white flowers barely 2 cm (.75") tall.  It produces a series of blooms throughout the fall.  The leaves follow the flowers, and are usually 3–5 in number.

References

micranthum
Plants described in 1882
Flora of Turkey
Taxa named by Pierre Edmond Boissier